A 2011 poll showed that 66% of Finnish respondents considered Finland to be a racist country but only 14% admitted to being racist themselves. Minority groups facing the most negative attitudes were Finnish Kale, Somalis, and ethnic groups mostly consisting of Muslims.

In December 2012, the Finnish Police reported an increase in cases of racism and related physical abuse. In February 2013, researchers of racism and multiculturalism reported an increase in the number of threats and abuse. In January 2013, Save the Children reported that immigrant children were facing an increasing amount of racist abuse. In June 2011, a researcher reported an increase in the amount of racist violence targeting children and teenagers.

According to the European Commission against Racism and Intolerance (ECRI) of the Council of Europe, neither Finland's Non-Discrimination Ombudsman nor its advisory board for Non-Discrimination have the financial and human resources to effectively perform according to their mandates. There is a National Discrimination Tribunal, but it cannot order compensation for victims of racial discrimination. The legal provisions of Finland's Aliens' Act are discriminatory and subject ethnic minorities to racial profiling by the police.

According to ECRI, the majority of people in Finland don't know enough about the Sami people (an indigenous ethnic minority in Finland) and are not taught enough about Sami people and culture in school. ECRI has criticized Finland for not having ratified the ILO-convention 169 on Indigenous and Tribal Peoples.

The Somali community in Finland as well as the Finnish Roma face discrimination and racism. Russians in Finland are discriminated against in employment.

Helsinki Regional Transport Authority case 
According to a report from Iltalehti, an alleged incident of racism and police brutality occurred on the evening of 4 July 2020 at the Central Railway Station of Helsinki Metro. The incident centers on two youths, one white male and one black male, who were apprehended together for not having a valid ticket. According to eyewitness accounts and unverified footage of the incident that was circulating on social media, the white youth was calmly spoken to by the police before being allowed to leave, however, the black teenager was allegedly thrown down onto the floor by security staff and placed in handcuffs. One security staff member was allegedly seen pressing his knee down on the teenager's neck, at which point the victim could be seen yelling out "I can't breathe" in English, which has clearly evoked images on social media in the case of George Floyd in the United States.  According to security staff and HSL department chief Janne Solala the white youth was cooperative, provided his ID when asked and didn't try to resist so force wasn't needed.  Meanwhile, after getting caught, the black teenager refused to provide his ID or any other information about himself and tried to flee from the scene. Finnish ticket inspectors have a right written in law to prevent a suspect from leaving if caught travelling without a valid ticket, and by the same law a person travelling without a ticket is required to provide their ID to the ticket inspector. According to Solala, this situation had nothing to do with racism, race or gender because security staff will use similar force on anyone who is resisting and noncooperative, native Finns included. Also, written statements and security camera footages indicated that excessive force was not used in this situation by the security staff.

See also

Environmental racism in Europe
Finnish Resistance Movement

References

Works cited

 
Finland
Racism in Europe